Brecknock Hall is a historic home located at Stirling in Suffolk County, New York. It was built in 1857 and is a -story, square cut ashlar stone residence in the Italianate style.  The central projecting gable has a one-room sized cupola centrally located on the roof.  Also on the property is a 19th-century barn, a small early 20th-century greenhouse, and an early 20th-century caretaker's house.

It was added to the National Register of Historic Places in 2005.

References

Houses on the National Register of Historic Places in New York (state)
Italianate architecture in New York (state)
Houses completed in 1857
Houses in Suffolk County, New York
National Register of Historic Places in Suffolk County, New York
1857 establishments in New York (state)